is the ecclesiastic head temple of Kōyasan Shingon Buddhism, located on , Wakayama Prefecture, Japan. Its name means Temple of the Diamond Mountain Peak. It is part of the "Sacred Sites and Pilgrimage Routes in the Kii Mountain Range" UNESCO World Heritage Site.

The temple was first constructed as Seigan-ji Temple in 1593 by Toyotomi Hideyoshi on the death of his mother, rebuilt in 1861, and given its present name in 1869. It contains many sliding screen doors painted by Kanō Tanyū (1602-1674) and members of the Kyoto Kanō school.

The temple's modern Banryūtei (蟠龍庭 rock garden) is Japan's largest (2340 square meters), with 140 granite stones arranged to suggest a pair of dragons emerging from clouds to protect the temple.

The 414th abbot of Kongōbu-ji is the Reverend Kogi Kasai, who also acts as the archbishop of the Kōyasan Shingon school.

At the temple, visitors can listen to the sermons of the monks and participate in ajikan meditation sessions. The term ajikan refers to a fundamental breathing and meditation method of Shingon Buddhism: "meditating on the letter A" written using the Siddhaṃ alphabet.

Gallery

See also
List of National Treasures of Japan (temples)
 List of National Treasures of Japan (ancient documents)
List of National Treasures of Japan (paintings)
List of National Treasures of Japan (sculptures)
List of National Treasures of Japan (writings)
List of National Treasures of Japan (crafts-others)
Tourism in Japan

References

 Japan Visitor article
 Wakayama Prefecture article
 Alison Main, Newell Platten, The Lure of the Japanese Garden, W. W. Norton & Company, 2002, page 46. .
 Dorothy Perkins, Encyclopedia of Japan: Japanese History and Culture, from Abacus to Zori, "Kongobuji" article, Facts on File, 1991, page 182. .

External links 
 Kongōbuji official site

Buddhist temples in Wakayama Prefecture
Religious buildings and structures completed in 816
9th-century establishments in Japan
National Treasures of Japan
Important Cultural Properties of Japan
World Heritage Sites in Japan
Historic Sites of Japan
Kūkai